Vvedensky (masculine) or Vvedenskaya (feminine) may refer to:
Alexander Vvedensky (poet) (1904–1941)

Alexander Vvedensky (religious leader) (1888–1946)
Arseny Vvedensky (1844–1909), literary critic
Boris Vvedensky, Russian radiophysicist, chief editor of the Great Soviet Encyclopedia

Nikolai Vvedensky (1852–1922), Russian physiologist